Cammermeyer is a surname. Notable people with the surname include:

Albert Cammermeyer (1838–1893), Norwegian bookseller and publisher
Johan Sebastian Cammermeyer (1730–1819), Norwegian Lutheran priest
Margarethe Cammermeyer (born 1942), American National Guard colonel and gay rights activist